Marija Kolaroska  (born September 21, 1997) is a cross-country skier competing for North Macedonia. She competed for Macedonia at the 2014 Winter Olympics in the 10 kilometre classical race.

See also
Macedonia at the 2014 Winter Olympics

References

1997 births
Living people
Macedonian female cross-country skiers
Cross-country skiers at the 2014 Winter Olympics
Olympic cross-country skiers of North Macedonia